The Cullman City Board of Education is composed of schools that serve the city of Cullman, Alabama, US. As of 2011, there are 3,017 students enrolled in Cullman City Schools.

As of early June 2015, Dr. Doreen Griffeth has resigned as the Superintendent of Cullman City Schools, her interim replacement is Dr. Susan Patterson.

Schools

Cullman City Head Start
Cullman City Primary School
East Elementary School
West Elementary School
Cullman Middle School
Cullman High School
Turning Point (Cullman City Alternative School)

References

External links
Cullman City Schools

School districts in Alabama
Education in Cullman County, Alabama
School districts established in 1908
1908 establishments in Alabama